The 2013 Tequila Patrón American Le Mans Series at Long Beach was an auto race held on the Long Beach road course in Long Beach, California on April 20 and 21, 2013.  The seventh running of the Long Beach event for the American Le Mans Series, this was the second round of the 2013 season.  The race weekend was shared with the IndyCar Series, which ran the Grand Prix of Long Beach.  Germans Klaus Graf and Lucas Luhr of Muscle Milk Pickett Racing won the race for the third year in succession.  The PC category was led by Colin Braun and Jon Bennett of CORE Autosport, while Scott Sharp and Guy Cosmo's Extreme Speed Motorsports entry was victorious in the P2 class.  The BMW Team RLL squad scored a one-two victory, led by Bill Auberlen and Maxime Martin; Henrique Cisneros, Jr. and Sean Edwards won the GTC class for NGT Motorsports.

Qualifying

Qualifying result
Pole position winners in each class are marked in bold.

Race

Race result
Class winners in bold.  Cars failing to complete 70% of their class winner's distance are marked as Not Classified (NC).

References

Long Beach
American Le Mans Series at Long Beach
American Le Mans Series at Long Beach